"Coup d'Etat" is a song recorded by South Korean singer-rapper G-Dragon featuring American DJs Diplo and Baauer, who also served as co-producer.  Released through YG Entertainment on September 2, 2013, it served as the second single to his album of the same name.

Background 
In June 2013, YG Entertainment announced that Missy Elliott and Diplo would be collaborating on the album, with Missy Elliot appearing on "Niliria" while Diplo appeared in "Coup d'Etat." Jessica Oak from Billboard magazine describes the album's title track, co-produced by American DJs Diplo and Baauer, as a slow tempo trap influenced song, which samples Gil Scott-Heron's "The Revolution Will Not Be Televised." YG Entertainment released the music video for "Coup d'Etat" on YouTube on September 1, 2013, which garnered over 750,000 views after a day. Seoul Beats praised the direction of the music video, describing it as "a vivid three minute, twenty-two second journey to the shadowy side of G-Dragon’s visual imagination."

Chart performance and sales

Weekly charts

Sales

Awards and nominations

References

External links 
 

2013 singles
2013 songs
Baauer songs
Diplo songs
G-Dragon songs
Song recordings produced by Diplo
Songs written by G-Dragon
YG Entertainment singles